"Real Love" is a song by R&B band Skyy, released in late 1989 from their Start of a Romance album.  It spent one week at number one on the R&B singles chart in 1990, and was the second consecutive R&B chart-topper off the album.   "Real Love" also charted on the Billboard Hot 100, peaking at number forty-seven.

See also
 R&B number-one hits of 1990 (USA)

References

1990 singles
Skyy (band) songs
1989 songs